Butler County is a county located in the southeast Ozark Foothills Region in the U.S. state of Missouri. As of the 2020 Census, the county's population was 42,130. The largest city and county seat is Poplar Bluff. The county was officially organized from Wayne County on February 27, 1849, and is named after former U.S. Representative William O. Butler (D-Kentucky), who was also an unsuccessful candidate for Vice President of the United States. The first meeting in the Butler County Courthouse was held on June 18, 1849.

Butler County comprises the Poplar Bluff, MO Micropolitan Statistical Area.

Geography

Adjacent counties
Wayne County  (north)
Stoddard County  (northeast)
Dunklin County  (southeast)
Clay County, Arkansas  (south)
Ripley County  (west)
Carter County  (northwest)

Major highways
 Future Interstate 57
 U.S. Route 60
 U.S. Route 67
 U.S. Route 160
 Route 51
 Route 53
 Route 142

National protected area
Mark Twain National Forest (part)

Demographics

As of the census of 2000, there were 40,867 people, 16,718 households, and 11,318 families residing in the county. The population density was 59 people per square mile (23/km2). There were 18,707 housing units at an average density of 27 per square mile (10/km2). The racial makeup of the county was 92.16% White, 5.22% Black or African American, 0.56% Native American, 0.44% Asian, 0.01% Pacific Islander, 0.26% from other races, and 1.36% from two or more races. Approximately 1.01% of the population were Hispanic or Latino of any race. Among the major first ancestries reported in Butler County were 31.7% American, 13.8% German, 11.6% Irish and 10.5% English.

There were 16,718 households, out of which 29.70% had children under the age of 18 living with them, 52.50% were married couples living together, 11.60% had a female householder with no husband present, and 32.30% were non-families. 28.00% of all households were made up of individuals, and 12.70% had someone living alone who was 65 years of age or older. The average household size was 2.39 and the average family size was 2.91.

In the county, the population was spread out, with 24.20% under the age of 18, 8.40% from 18 to 24, 26.60% from 25 to 44, 24.10% from 45 to 64, and 16.70% who were 65 years of age or older. The median age was 39 years. For every 100 females there were 92.00 males. For every 100 females age 18 and over, there were 87.10 males.

The median income for a household in the county was $34,422, and the median income for a family was $42,713. Males had a median income of $27,449 versus $19,374 for females. The per capita income for the county was $20,282. About 14.00% of families and 18.60% of the population were below the poverty line, including 25.90% of those under age 18 and 16.90% of those age 65 or over.

Religion
According to the Association of Religion Data Archives County Membership Report (2010), Butler County is part of the Bible Belt, with evangelical Protestantism being the most predominant religion. The most predominant denominations among residents in Butler County who adhere to a religion are Southern Baptists (36.39%), nondenominational evangelical groups (14.64%), and Roman Catholics (11.92%).

2020 Census

Education
Of adults 25 years of age and older in Butler County, 70.5% possesses a high school diploma or higher while 11.6% holds a bachelor's degree or higher as their highest educational attainment.

Public Schools
Neelyville R-IV School District - Neelyville
Hillview Elementary School - Harviell - (PK-02)
Neelyville Elementary School - (03-06)
Neelyville High School - (07-12) 
Poplar Bluff R-I School District - Poplar Bluff
Eugene Field Elementary School - (01-03)
Mark Twain Early Childhood Center - (PK/Daycare)
Lake Road Elementary School - (01-04)
Poplar Bluff Kindergarten Center - (K)
O'Neal Elementary School - (01-03)
Oak Grove Elementary School - (01-03)
Poplar Bluff Middle School - (04-06)
Poplar Bluff Jr. High School (07-08)
Poplar Bluff High School (09-12)
Twin Rivers R-X School District - Broseley
Fisk Elementary School - Fisk - (K-08)
Qulin Elementary School - Qulin - (K-08)
Twin Rivers High School - Broseley - (09-12)

Private schools
Agape Christian School - Poplar Bluff - (K-12) - Non-denominational Christian
Sacred Heart Elementary School - Poplar Bluff - (PK-08) - Roman Catholic
Southern Missouri Christian School - Poplar Bluff - (K-12) - Assembly of God/Pentecostal
Westwood Baptist Academy - Poplar Bluff - (PK-12) - Baptist
Zion Lutheran School - Poplar Bluff - Lutheran Church–Missouri Synod

Special education/other schools
Hentz Alternative Learning Center - Poplar Bluff
Shady Grove State School - Poplar Bluff 
Sierra-Osage Treatment Center - Poplar Bluff
W.E. Sears Youth Center - Poplar Bluff

Post-secondary
Three Rivers College - Poplar Bluff - A public, two-year community college.

Public libraries
 Fisk Community Library  
Poplar Bluff Public Library

Politics

Local

The Republican Party completely controls all politics at the local level in Butler County.

State

Butler County is split between two legislative districts in the Missouri House of Representatives, both of which are represented by Republicans.

 District 152 is currently represented by Hardy Billington (R-Poplar Bluff). It consists of all of the cities of Neelyville, Qulin, and Poplar Bluff; all of the census-designated place of Harviell; and the unincorporated communities of Angus, Batesville, Belcher, Booser, Broseley, Fagus, Hubbel, Kremlin, Loma Linda, Nyssa, Oglesville, Platanus, Resnik, Roxie, Taft, and Vastus.

 District 153 is currently represented by Darrell Atchison (R-Williamsville). It consists of all of the city of Fisk and the unincorporated communities of Ash Hill, Barron, Empire, Halloran, Hamtown, Hendrickson, Hilliard, Keener, Kinzer, Morocco, Rombauer, and Wilby.

All of Butler County is included in Missouri's 25th Senatorial District and is represented by Republican Jason Bean (R-Holcomb) in the Missouri Senate.

Federal
All of Butler County is included in Missouri's 8th Congressional District and is currently represented by Jason Smith (R-Salem) in the U.S. House of Representatives. Smith was elected to a fifth term in 2020 over Democratic challenger Kathy Ellis.

Butler County, along with the rest of the state of Missouri, is represented in the U.S. Senate by Josh Hawley (R-Columbia) and Roy Blunt (R-Strafford).

Blunt was elected to a second term in 2016 over then-Missouri Secretary of State Jason Kander.

Political culture

At the presidential level, Butler County is solidly Republican. Butler County strongly favored Donald Trump in both 2016 and 2020. Bill Clinton was the last Democratic presidential nominee to carry Butler County in 1992 with a plurality of the vote, and a Democrat hasn't won majority support from the county's voters in a presidential election since Jimmy Carter in 1976.

Like most rural areas throughout Missouri, voters in Butler County generally adhere to socially and culturally conservative principles which tend to influence their Republican leanings. Despite Butler County's longstanding tradition of supporting socially conservative platforms, voters in the county have a penchant for advancing populist causes. In 2018, Missourians voted on a proposition (Proposition A) concerning right to work, the outcome of which ultimately reversed the right to work legislation passed in the state the previous year. 54.47% of Butler County voters cast their ballots to overturn the law.

Missouri presidential preference primaries

2020
The 2020 presidential primaries for both the Democratic and Republican parties were held in Missouri on March 10. On the Democratic side, former Vice President Joe Biden (D-Delaware) both won statewide and carried Butler County by a wide margin. Biden went on to defeat President Donald Trump in the general election.

Incumbent President Donald Trump (R-Florida) faced a primary challenge from former Massachusetts Governor Bill Weld, but won both Butler County and statewide by overwhelming margins.

2016
The 2016 presidential primaries for both the Republican and Democratic parties were held in Missouri on March 15. Businessman Donald Trump (R-New York) narrowly won the state overall, but carried a majority of the vote in Butler County. He went on to win the presidency.

On the Democratic side, former Secretary of State Hillary Clinton (D-New York) narrowly won statewide and carried a majority in Butler County.

2012
The 2012 Missouri Republican Presidential Primary's results were nonbinding on the state's national convention delegates. Voters in Butler County supported former U.S. Senator Rick Santorum (R-Pennsylvania), who finished first in the state at large, but eventually lost the nomination to former Governor Mitt Romney (R-Massachusetts). Delegates to the congressional district and state conventions were chosen at a county caucus, which selected a delegation favoring Santorum. Incumbent President Barack Obama easily won the Missouri Democratic Primary and renomination. He defeated Romney in the general election.

2008
In 2008, the Missouri Republican Presidential Primary was closely contested, with Senator John McCain (R-Arizona) prevailing and eventually winning the nomination. However, former Governor Mike Huckabee (R-Arkansas) won a plurality in Butler County.

Then-Senator Hillary Clinton (D-New York) received more votes than any candidate from either party in Butler County during the 2008 presidential primary. Despite initial reports that Clinton had won Missouri, Barack Obama (D-Illinois), also a Senator at the time, narrowly defeated her statewide and later became that year's Democratic nominee, going on to win the presidency.

Communities

Cities 

 Fisk
 Neelyville
 Poplar Bluff (county seat and largest municipality)
 Qulin

Census-designated places
Fairdealing (part)
Harviell

Other unincorporated communities

 Ash Hill
 Batesville
 Broseley
 Empire
 Fagus
 Halloran
 Hendrickson
 Kinzer
 Oglesville
 Rombauer
 Taft
 Vastus
 Wappapello
 Wilby

Townships
Butler County is divided into ten townships:

 Ash Hill
 Beaver Dam
 Black River
 Cane Creek
 Coon Island
 Epps
 Gillis Bluff
 Neely
 Poplar Bluff
 St. Francois

Notable people
 Linda Bloodworth-Thomason, television producer (Designing Women)
 Christian Boeving, fitness model, bodybuilder and actor
Sean Fister, 1995, 2001 and 2005 World Long Drive Champion, inducted to 3 Hall of Fames 
 Leroy Griffith, burlesque theater owner and film producer
Tyler Hansbrough, NBA basketball player for the Toronto Raptors, Indiana Pacers and the Charlotte Hornets 
 Scott Innes, radio broadcaster and voice actor for Scooby-Doo
 Charles Jaco, CNN reporter
 Billie G. Kanell, Medal of Honor recipient, United States Army
 Tim Lollar, professional baseball pitcher
 Matt Lucas, singer, drummer and songwriter
 Julie McCullough, actress-model (Growing Pains and Playboy Playmate)
 Derland Moore, professional football player
Mikel Rouse, composer

See also
National Register of Historic Places listings in Butler County, Missouri
List of counties in Missouri

References

External links
 Digitized 1930 Plat Book of Butler County  from University of Missouri Division of Special Collections, Archives, and Rare Books

 
Missouri counties
1849 establishments in Missouri
Populated places established in 1849